The Belarusian Premier League or the Vyšejšaja Liha or the Vysheyshaya Liga ("Top League") is the top division of professional football in Belarus, and is organized by the Belarusian Football Federation. The number of teams in the competition has varied over the years from as high as 17 (1992–93 season) to as low as 11 (2012).  the league included 16 teams. Each team plays every other team twice during the course of the season. At the end of the season, the two teams with the fewest points are automatically relegated to the Belarusian First League, while the third worst team plays a promotion-relegation playoff against the third best team from the second tier. The top two teams from the Belarusian First League automatically win promotion to the Premier League. Shakhtyor Soligorsk are the current champions, after winning their second championship title in 2021.

History
The Belarusian Premier League was organized in 1992. The first participants were: Dinamo Minsk, the only Belarusian side in the former Soviet Top League, five teams from the lower tiers of the Soviet league system and represented other five regional centers of Belarus, and ten teams who were previous competitors in the Belarusian SSR First League.

After the league creation, it was decided to change its schedule from a Soviet-style summer season to a European-style winter season. In 1995, the winter season experiment was proven unsuccessful due to poor weather and field conditions in Belarus in the late autumn and early spring. The season was changed back to summer. Every season since 1996 has been played in the summer. Throughout the 2000s, the number of competing teams has changed several times. 2012 season was played with only 11 teams due to last minute withdrawal of Partizan Minsk.

In its earliest years, the league was dominated by Dinamo Minsk, who won the league five times in a row between 1992 and 1995. During the next ten seasons, seven different teams finished as champions: Slavia Mozyr (1996 as MPKC Mozyr, 2000), Dinamo Minsk (1997, 2004), Dnepr-Transmash Mogilev (1998), BATE Borisov (1999, 2002), Belshina Bobruisk (2001), Gomel (2003), Shakhtyor Soligorsk (2005). Since 2006, BATE Borisov has dominated the league, winning 13 championships in a row (2006–2018).

In March 2020, due to the COVID-19 pandemic, all the other football leagues in Europe were postponed, and by the end of the month, the Belarusian Premier League was the only top-flight league in the continent that was still playing. Due to this, the league gained substantially increased viewership from abroad, with fans from all over the world watching the games online, due to the league being the only significant professional football available; the league signed new television rights deals with networks from countries including Russia and India. Matches were also streamed on the Belarusian Football Federation's YouTube channel.  British betting companies also offered odds for the various matches, as the league's profile, previously relatively unknown outside of the country, grew a larger audience due to sporting inactivity elsewhere.

Premier League in 2022

Soviet era champions

1922: Minsk (city team)
1923: Unknown
1924: Minsk (city team)
1925: Unknown
1926: Bobruisk (city team)
1927: Unknown
1928: Gomel (city team)
1929–32: Unknown
1933: Gomel (city team)
1934: BVO (Minsk)           
1935: BVO (Minsk)          
1936: BVO (Minsk)              
1937: Dinamo (Minsk)           
1938: Dinamo (Minsk)           
1939: Dinamo (Minsk)          
1940: DKA (Minsk)              
1941–44: Unknown
1945: Dinamo (Minsk)           
1946: ODO (Minsk)               
1947: Torpedo (Minsk)     
1948: Traktor MTZ (Minsk)        
1949: Traktor MTZ (Minsk)       
1950: ODO (Minsk)              
1951: Dinamo (Minsk)           
1952: ODO (Minsk)               
1953: Spartak (Minsk)     
1954: ODO (Pinsk)               
1955: FSM (Minsk)              
1956: Spartak (Minsk)          
1957: Sputnik (Minsk)        
1958: Spartak (Bobruisk)
1959: Minsk (city team)         
1960: Sputnik (Minsk)             
1961: Volna (Pinsk)            
1962: Torpedo (Minsk)          
1963: Naroch' (Molodechno)      
1964: SKA (Minsk)               
1965: SKA (Minsk)               
1966: Torpedo (Minsk)     
1967: Torpedo (Minsk)         
1968: Sputnik (Minsk)           
1969: Torpedo (Minsk)  
1970: Torpedo (Zhodino)        
1971: Torpedo (Zhodino)        
1972: Stroitel' (Bobruisk)     
1973: Stroitel' (Bobruisk)    
1974: BATE (Borisov)      
1975: Dinamo (Minsk)     
1976: BATE (Borisov)            
1977: Sputnik (Minsk)         
1978: Shinnik (Bobruisk)  
1979: BATE (Borisov)            
1980: Torpedo (Zhodino)        
1981: Torpedo (Zhodino)        
1982: Torpedo (Mogilev)        
1983: Obuvschik (Lida)            
1984: Orbita (Minsk)       
1985: Obuvschik (Lida)         
1986: Obuvschik (Lida)       
1987: Shinnik (Bobruisk)    
1988: Sputnik (Minsk)
1989: Obuvschik (Lida)
1990: Sputnik (Minsk)
1991: Metallurg (Molodechno)

Champions and top scorers

Performances

Performance by club

All-time table
As of end of 2022 season.

For clubs that have been renamed, their name at the time of their most recent season in the Premier League is given. The current members are listed in bold.
Includes 2002 championship play-off, 2004 relegation play-off, 14 games of Dinamo-93 in 1998 season, 15 games of Torpedo Minsk in 2019 season, and 15 games of Sputnik Rechitsa in 2021 season.
For the purposes of this table, each win is worth 3 points. The three-points system was adopted in fall 1995 season.

Player of the year
Belarusian Premier League Player of the year is an annual award given by a sports newspaper Pressball.

Reserves League

An annual league competition is organized for the reserve teams of Premier League clubs since 2001. This tournament was won by the reserves of Dinamo Minsk (9 titles), Gomel (2 titles), Shakhtyor Soligorsk (2 titles), BATE Borisov (1 title), Torpedo-BelAZ Zhodino (1 title) and Dnepr Mogilev (1 title).

Notes

References

External links
 Official website
 Belarusian Football Federation
 RSSSF.com - List of Champions

 
1
Belarus
Sports leagues established in 1992
1992 establishments in Belarus
Football
Professional sports leagues in Belarus